Marvel Super Hero Island is an area at Universal Orlando's Islands of Adventure park in Orlando, Florida that is themed after popular Marvel Comics superheroes. The area opened in 1999, ten years prior to Universal competitor The Walt Disney Company acquiring Marvel Entertainment in 2009. The island is home to four attractions, including The Incredible Hulk and The Amazing Adventures of Spider-Man. Marvel Super Hero Island’s architecture and theming is modeled after a Marvel comic book, with a comic book color scheme, amplified angles, and cutouts of many of the most popular Marvel characters.

History
What is today known as Marvel Super Hero Island was originally conceived as "DC Superhero Land", an area featuring DC Comics superheroes,  which was inspired by the success of Tim Burton's 1989 Batman film starring Michael Keaton. Along with the success of Universal Studios Florida's opening in 1990, MCA Inc. (then-owner of Universal Pictures and Universal Parks & Resorts) and Warner Bros. began entering negotiations in the early 1990s for theme park rights to DC Comics for the "second gate" adjacent to Universal Studios Florida, originally known as "Cartoon World" (later changed to Islands of Adventure). Ultimately, the deal fell through, as Time Warner acquired Six Flags in whole in 1990 and obtained the full license to DC Comics, and due to the heated dispute regarding royalty payment for the characters' park presence between Warner Bros. and MCA.

Meanwhile, Marvel Entertainment Group, Inc. sold off their characters' film rights to several major film studios, including Universal Pictures. MCA then eventually negotiated with Marvel for the theme park rights to their characters and both companies signed an agreement on March 22, 1994. This contract stipulated that "MCA will construct a complex of attractions, stores and food venues heavily themed around the Marvel properties" under the Marvel Universe banner at the second gate. The agreement remains in perpetuity (aka good faith), or indefinitely, unless Universal decides to close the Marvel Universe area, stop making payments for property usage, or Marvel opts out of the contract providing that it needs a reasonable explanation that Universal is mishandling the usage of their property.

Construction of Islands of Adventure began in 1997, with the Marvel Universe area being officially named "Marvel Super Hero Island". Islands of Adventure opened up to soft openings on March 27, 1999, and officially opened two months later on May 28. Marvel Super Hero Island is among the six of the original islands in the park.

Attractions
Marvel Super Hero Island currently features four attractions.

The Amazing Adventures of Spider-Man is a motion-based 3D dark ride, which was considered a huge technological achievement, combining 3-D film, ride movement, and special effects for the very first time. The ride takes place in New York City and features Spider-Man taking on the Sinister Syndicate, when it is learned that they seize the Statue of Liberty with an anti-gravity gun and threatens to destroy the statue if the city does not surrender to them. Guests enters through the Daily Bugle with empty offices and apparently all of the reporters have fled in the midst of the carnage. With no reporters left, the Bugle's Editor-in-Chief J. Jonah Jameson hatches a plan to send guests as would-be-reporters to cover the story in the news-gathering vehicle, known as the SCOOP.

The Incredible Hulk Coaster is a launched roller coaster themed after comic book superhero character, the Hulk. From 1999 to 2015, guests entered the science laboratory of Dr. Bruce Banner with many televisions showing a cartoon of the story centered around the Hulk. After the Hulk roller coaster was opened in 2016 as part of the refurbishment, a new, original storyline was added with a completely redesigned queue experience that places guests inside a perilous scientific experiment led by General Thaddeus Ross, which shows CGI animations of test subjects being exposed to gamma radiation and being transformed into Hulk-like creatures.

Doctor Doom's Fearfall is a space shot ride based around the Fantastic Four's main villain, Doctor Doom. The plot involves Doom's latest invention by using the guests' fear as part of an effort to defeat the Fantastic Four. The guests become a subject of Dr. Doom and traps them so he can have their fear extracted.

Storm Force Accelatron is a teacup ride themed after a popular member of X-Men, Storm. It opened on May 28, 2000,  a year after the rest of the Marvel Super Hero Island attractions opened. Riders are made to spin around in order to power the Accelatron, a device that amplify the mutants' abilities, to allow the X-Men, Professor X and Storm, to defeat Magneto.

Dining, merchandise shops, and meet and greets

Marvel Super Hero Island is also home to dining and merchandise shops. Cafe 4 is a futuristic command center-like restaurant themed after characters from the Fantastic Four universe, featuring a cafeteria with Italian-American cuisine options. Captain America Diner is a restaurant themed around Captain America and other members of the Avengers (e.g., Iron Man, Thor, Scarlet Witch, Ant-Man, etc.) as well as its related villains, featuring typical fast foods like cheeseburgers, chicken sandwiches, chicken fingers, crispy chicken salads, and more. Merchandise items can be bought from a variety of themed stores including Spider-Man Shop (which guests exits from The Amazing Adventures of Spider-Man ride), Marvel Alterniverse Store, Comic Book Shop, and Oakley. "Meet Spider-Man and the Marvel Super Heroes" is a meet-and-greet attraction, where guests can meet superheroes including Wolverine, Storm, Cyclops, and Rogue, Spider-Man, and Captain America.

Disney's acquisition of Marvel
On August 31, 2009, The Walt Disney Company (Universal's largest rival in the theme park market) agreed to purchase Marvel Entertainment for $4 billion. The deal was finalized on December 31, 2009 in which Disney acquired full ownership on the company. Universal stated that the acquisition would not impact its theme park licensing agreement with Marvel, while Disney CEO Bob Iger acknowledged that Disney would continue to honor any contracts that Marvel currently has with Disney competitors.

The 1994 agreement between Marvel Entertainment and Comcast/NBCUniversal (Universal's current parent companies) governs the use of Marvel properties in non-Universal theme parks and dictates what parks in the region can use such properties. Currently, Islands of Adventure uses the Avengers, Spider-Man, X-Men, and the Fantastic Four, while Universal Studios Japan only employs Spider-Man, as it has operated the Islands of Adventure cloned ride The Amazing Adventures of Spider-Man since 2004. The contract forbids Walt Disney World and the Tokyo Disney Resort from installing these characters, as well as the other characters in the same "family" (i.e. any team members, side characters, and villains closely associated with the superheroes). In addition, Disney is not allowed to use the "Marvel" name in all of the U.S. and Japan, nor create a Marvel-themed simulator ride within the legal designated regional distances of any Universal theme park in the U.S. and Japan regardless of whether the Marvel characters are being used by Comcast/NBCUniversal.

The Disneyland Resort is not constrained by the agreement, as the contract allows Disney to utilize any Marvel character (regardless of whether it is being used by Comcast/NBCUniversal) west of the Mississippi River. However, the resort is still bound by the clause of not being able to use the "Marvel" name. Disney parks outside the United States and Japan are permitted to use any Marvel properties, the Marvel name, as well as any type of ride they want. Both Hong Kong Disneyland and Disney California Adventure have opened Marvel attractions since the acquisition, including Iron Man Experience and Ant-Man and The Wasp: Nano Battle! at the former and Guardians of the Galaxy – Mission: Breakout! at the latter. In 2017, Disney announced plans to erect a series of Marvel Cinematic Universe-themed lands called Avengers Campus at Disney California Adventure, Hong Kong Disneyland, and Disneyland Paris, with the first one opening in June 2021 at Disney California Adventure. Shanghai Disneyland also have plans to incorporate Marvel attractions, while Tokyo Disneyland opened a Big Hero 6 attraction called "The Happy Ride With Baymax".

Meanwhile, Disney World has taken other measures to promote its Marvel properties within the Resort. At the D23 Expo on July 14–16, 2017, Disney announced that Guardians of the Galaxy: Cosmic Rewind would be coming to Epcot which forced the closure of Ellen's Energy Adventure on August 13. Monorail trains have been wrapped in advertisements promoting films such as The Avengers, Iron Man 3, and Captain America: Civil War. As these monorail trains feature Marvel characters that are used at Islands of Adventure, they are operated only on the Resort and Express lines of the Walt Disney World Monorail System, which run entirely outside the theme parks, unlike the Epcot line, which enters and loops through its namesake park. The resort does have a Marvel-themed store, Super Hero Headquarters. However, it is also located outside of park gates in Disney Springs. Marvel characters not connected with the ones at Islands of Adventure also appears at Disney's Hollywood Studios in form of meet and greets, such as Star-Lord and Gamora from Guardians of the Galaxy, as well as Dr. Strange from Doctor Strange.

Halloween Horror Nights
In 2002, during Halloween Horror Nights 12, Marvel Super Hero Island was converted into a scarezone known as "Island Under Siege", loosely based upon the 14-part comic book story, Maximum Carnage. It featured an alternative plot where Spider-Man's archenemy, Carnage, killed most of the Marvel superheroes and took over the island. Criminal gangs running amok the streets, and law and order has been broken down as a result. A haunted house, "Maximum Carnage",  was also featured in which guests had to explore through Carnage's hideout containing all his henchmen and the bloody remains of several superheroes.

Characters used at Marvel Super Hero Island
The following list of characters are or may'' be seen at Marvel Super Hero Island. This includes from actual costume appearances to 2D drawings all around buildings to videos seen at attractions.

Gallery

References

External links

Marvel Comics in amusement parks
Amusement rides introduced in 1999
Universal Parks & Resorts attractions by name
Licensed properties at Universal Parks & Resorts
Islands of Adventure
Universal Studios Florida
1999 establishments in Florida